The 1976 United States presidential election in Alabama took place on November 2, 1976, as part of the 1976 presidential election. Voters chose nine representatives, or electors, to the Electoral College, who voted for president and vice president.

Alabama voted for the Democratic nominee, former Governor Jimmy Carter, over the Republican nominee, President Gerald Ford. Carter won Alabama by a margin of 13.12%. , this is the last time Alabama has voted Democratic in a presidential election, as well as the last time a Democrat carried any of the following counties: Madison, Tuscaloosa, Calhoun, St. Clair, Elmore, DeKalb, Blount, Autauga, Dale, Coffee, Chilton, Escambia, Covington, Pike, Geneva, Winston, Monroe, and Cleburne. This is also the sole election since Franklin D. Roosevelt eked out a one-vote plurality in 1932 that a Democrat carried traditionally Republican Winston County, and the sole one since James Buchanan in 1856 that a Democrat won an absolute majority of the vote there.

Results

Result by county

See also
United States presidential elections in Alabama

Notes

References

Alabama
1976
1976 Alabama elections